Farm Ridge Township is located in LaSalle County, Illinois. As of the 2010 census, its population was 918 and it contained 376 housing units.

Geography

Demographics

References

External links
US Census
City-data.com
Illinois State Archives

Townships in LaSalle County, Illinois
Populated places established in 1849
Townships in Illinois
1849 establishments in Illinois